The term useful Jew was used in various historical contexts, typically describing a Jew useful in implementing an official authority's policy, sometimes by oppressing other Jews.

 In 1744, Frederick II of Prussia introduced the practice of limiting Jewish population to a small number of the most wealthy families, known as "protected Jews" (Schutzjuden). The first-born son in such families inherited this privilege; other children were considered useless by the authorities and had the choice of either abstaining from marriage or leaving.
 Following the establishment of the Pale of Settlement by Imperial Russia, only "useful Jews" were allowed to live outside the Pale; these included Jews such as wealthy first-rung merchants, persons who had received higher education, cantonists (after serving their full term in the army), and some other categories.
 In the Soviet Union, Jewish members of the Anti-Zionist Committee of the Soviet Public were colloquially known as "useful Jews" or "pocket Jews", implying their corruption by high positions in the state hierarchy.

See also

 Chaim Rumkowski, a Jew who collaborated with the Nazis
 Court Jew
 Jewish Question
 Schutz-Jude
 Self-hating Jew
 Shtadlan
 Stella Kübler
 Uncle Tom
 Useful idiot
 Kapo
 Judenrat
  Anti-Zionist Jews
 Jewish Bolshevism

Notes

Disabilities (Jewish) in Europe
Social groups